The following is the timeline of the COVID-19 pandemic in India.

June

1 June
204 deaths and 8,171 cases were reported. New cases were reported in the states/UTs as following:

Assam: 22 cases

Odisha: 156 cases

Delhiː 990 cases

Maharashtraː 2,361 cases

2 June̝
217 deaths and 8,909 cases were reported. New cases were reported in the states/UTs as following:

Andhra Pradeshː 115 cases

Tamil Naduː 1,091 cases

Keralaː 86 cases

3 June̝
293 deaths and 9,304 cases were reported. New cases were reported in the states/UTs as following:

Tamil Naduː 1,286 cases

Andhra Pradeshː 79 cases

Keralaː 82 cases

Maharashtraː 2,560 cases

4 June
273 deaths and 9,851 cases were reported. New cases were reported in the states/UTs as following:

Andhara Pardesh: 98 cases

Maharashtraː 2,933 cases

Gujaratː 485 cases

Tamil Naduː 1373 cases

5 June
294 deaths and 9,887 cases were reported. New cases were reported in the states/UTs as following:

Andhra Pradesh: 50 cases

Maharashtraː 2436 cases

Tamil Nadu: 1,438 cases

Karnataka: 515 cases

6 June
287 deaths and 9,971 cases were reported. New cases were reported in the states/UTs as following:

Karnataka: 378 cases

Bihar: 147 cases

Andhra Pradesh: 161 cases

Maharashtraː 2,739 cases

Gujaratː 498 cases

7 June
271 deaths and 9,983 cases were reported. New cases were reported in the states/UTs as following:

Andhra Pradesh: 130 cases

Delhi: 1,320 cases

8 June
271 deaths and 9,983 cases were reported. New cases were reported in the states/UTs as following: New cases were reported in the states/UTs as following:

Andhra Pradesh: 125 cases

Odisha: 138 cases

Kerala: 91 cases

9 June
274 deaths and 9985 cases were reported.

Tamil Nadu: 1,685 cases

Andhra Pradesh: 147 cases

Karnataka: 161 cases

10 June
New cases were reported in the states/UTs as following:

Tamil Nadu: 1927 cases

Karnataka: 120 cases

Andhra Pradesh: 218 cases

11 June
New cases were reported in the states/UTs as following:

Tamil Nadu: 1875 cases

Karnataka: 204 cases

Andhra Pradesh: 135 cases

12 June
New cases were reported in the states/UTs as following:

Tamil Nadu: 1982 cases

Andhra Pradesh: 141 cases

Odisha: 112 cases

14 June
New cases were reported in the states/UTs as following:

Tamil Nadu: 1974 cases.

Karnataka: 176 cases.

Andhra Pradesh: 253 cases.

15 June
New cases were reported in the states/UTs as following:

Kartataka: 213 cases.

Tamil Nadu: 1843 cases.

16 June
New cases were reported in the states/UTs as following:

Tamil Nadu: 1515 cases.

Karnataka: 317 cases.

17 June
New cases were reported in the states/UTs as following:

Tamil Nadu: 2174 cases.

West Bengal: 391 cases.

Andhra Pradesh: 275 cases.

18 June
New cases were reported in the states/UTs as following:

Tamil Nadu: 2141 cases.

Karnataka: 210 cases.

Andhra Pradesh: 210 cases.

19 June
New cases were reported in the states/UTs as following:

Tamil Nadu: 2115 cases.

Gujarat: 540 cases.

20 June
New cases were reported in the states/UTs as following:

Karnataka: 416 cases.

Tamil Nadu: 2396 cases.

21 June
New cases were reported in the states/UTs as following:

Tamil Nadu: 2352 cases.

Karnataka:453 cases.

Andhra Pradesh: 477 cases.

23 June
New cases were reported in the states/UTs as following:

Tamil Nadu: 2516 cases.

Andhra ̪Pardesh: 462 cases.

24 June
New cases were reported in the states/UTs as following:

Maharastra: 3890 cases.

Tamil Nadu:2865 cases.

25 June
New cases were reported in the states/UTs as following:

Tamil Nadu: 2509 cases.

Andhra Pradesh: 553 cases.

26 June
New cases were reported in the states/UTs as following:

Tamil Nadu: 3523 cases.

Maharashtraː 5024 cases.

27 June
New cases were reported in the states/UTs as following:

Delhiː 2948 cases.

Tamil Naduː 3713 cases.

28 June
New cases were reported in the states/UTs as following:

Delhiː 2889 cases.

Tamil Naduː 3940 cases.

29 June
New cases were reported in the states/UTs as following:

Tamil Naduː 3949 cases.

30 June
New cases were reported in the states/UTs as following:

Tamil Naduː 3943 cases.

Keralaː 131 cases.

July

1 July
New cases were reported in the states/UTs as following:

Tamil Nadu: 3882 cases

Uttar Pradesh: 564 cases

2 July
New cases were reported in the states/UTs as following:

Tamil Nadu: 4343 cases.

Punjab: 120 cases.

3 July
New cases were reported in the states/UTs as following:

Tamil Nadu: 4329 cases.

Kerala: 211 cases.

4 July
New cases were reported in the states/UTs as following:

Delhi: 2505 cases.

Tamil Nadu: 4280 cases.

5 July
New cases were reported in the states/UTs as following:

Delhi: 2244 cases.

Andhra Pradesh: 2244 cases.

6 July
New cases were reported in the states/UTs as following:

Maharashtra: 5368 cases.

Tamil Nadu: 3827 cases.

7 July
New cases were reported in the states/UTs as following:

Uttar Pradesh: 1346 cases.

Maharashtra: 5134 cases.

8 July
New cases were reported in the states/UTs as following:

Kerala: 301 cases.

Tamil Nadu: 3756 cases.

9 July
New cases were reported in the states/UTs as following:

Andhra Pradesh: 155 cases.

Delhi: 2187 cases.

10 July
New cases were reported in the states/UTs as following:

Tamil Nadu: 3680 cases.

Andhra Pradesh: 1608 cases.

11 July
New cases were reported in the states/UTs as following:

Tamil Nadu: 3965 cases.

Andhra Pradesh: 1813 cases.

12 July
New cases were reported in the states/UTs as following:

Tamil Nadu: 4244 cases.

Delhi: 1574 cases.

13 July
New cases were reported in the states/UTs as following:

Uttar Pradesh: 1644 cases.

Tamil Nadu: 4328 cases.

15 July
New cases were reported in the states/UTs as following:

Kerala: 623 cases.

Andhra Pradesh: 2432 cases.

16 July
New cases were reported in the states/UTs as following:

Maharashtra: 8641 cases.

Karnataka: 4169 cases.

17 July
New cases were reported in the states/UTs as following:

Maharashtra: 8308 cases.

Karnataka: 3693 cases.

18 July
New cases were reported in the states/UTs as following:

Delhi: 1475 cases.

Tamil Nadu: 4807 cases.

19 July
New cases were reported in the states/UTs as following:

Delhi: 1211 cases.

20 July
New cases were reported in the states/UTs as following:

Andhra Pradesh: 4074 cases.

Kerala: 794 cases.

21 July
New cases were reported in the states/UTs as following:

Delhi: 1349 cases.

Tamil Nadu: 4965 cases.

22 July
New cases were reported in the states/UTs as following:

Maharashtra: 10576 cases.

23 July
New cases were reported in the states/UTs as following:

Maharashtra: 9895 cases.

24 July
New cases were reported in the states/UTs as following:

Tamil Nadu: 6785 cases.

25 July
New cases were reported in the states/UTs as following:

Delhi: 1142 cases.

Tamil Nadu: 6988 cases.

26 July
New cases were reported in the states/UTs as following:

Rajasthan: 1120 cases.

27 July
New cases were reported in the states/UTs as following:

Maharashtra: 7924 cases.

28 July
New cases were reported in the states/UTs as following:

Maharashtra: 7717 cases.

29 July
New cases were reported in the states/UTs as following:

Tamil Nadu: 6426 cases.

30 July
New cases were reported in the states/UTs as following:

Andhra Pradesh: 10167 cases.

31 July
New cases were reported in the states/UTs as following:

Maharashtra: 10167 cases.

August

1 August
Kerala: 1129 cases.
Tamil Nadu: 5879 cases.

2 August
Maharashtra: 9509 cases.

8 August
Indian Medical Association says nearly 198 doctors died due to COVID.

September

October

November

December

2021

Notes

References

External links 

  – COVID-19 Management videos by the Ministry of Health and Family Welfare

2020 B
Coronavirus 2020 B
2020 B
Coronavirus 2020 B
Timeline of the COVID-19 pandemic in India 2020 B